The 2014 Adelaide heatwave was a heat wave that occurred in Adelaide, South Australia in both January and February 2014. The heatwaves were so strong that it broke records, becoming the hottest summer ever recorded in Adelaide. Although there were no deaths directly linked to the heatwave as of 2015, there were at least 136 heat-related hospital admissions recorded.

Statistics
Adelaide's record breaking temperatures during the heatwaves:

 Hottest February day –  on 2 February 2014. Roseworthy recorded 46 °C, the second year in which Roseworthy reached such a temperature.
 Record number of days exceeding  during the summer months (December, January and February) – 13.
 Record number of days exceeding  during a calendar year - 9.
 Record number of consecutive days exceeding  – 5.

References

See also
 Climate of Adelaide
 Heat wave
 Climate change in Australia

History of Adelaide
Environment of South Australia